The name Rosanna  is the combination of Rosa (Rose) and Anna.

It should not be confused with Rossana, which is the Italian form of Roxana (see Roxanne).

Spellings: Rosanna, Rosana, Rozana, Roseanna, Rosannah, Rose Anna, Rossana, Rosanagh.

Meaning: Rose, Gracious Rose

Usage: Latin, Spanish (Rosana), Romanian (Roxana), Portuguese (Rosana), English, Italian.

People named Rosanna 
Rosanna Arquette, American actress, film director, and film producer
Rosanna Davison, Irish socialite and model, and winner of the Miss World 2003 title
Rosanna Munter, Swedish pop singer
Rosanna Pansino, American YouTube personality
Rosanna Raymond (born 1967), New Zealand artist, poet, and cultural commentator
Rosanna Tavarez, American singer, television personality, dancer, and teacher
Dame Rosanna Wong, British-Hong Kong politician and social work administrator

People named Rosana 
''See Rosana

References

Feminine given names
Given names derived from plants or flowers